Leonard Winfield Hutchinson Gibbs (February 6, 1875 in Salamanca, Cattaraugus County, New York – June 1, 1930) was an American lawyer and politician from New York.

Life
He was the son of Walter H. Gibbs (1845–1914) and Anna T. (Sexsmith) Gibbs (1853–1917). The family removed in 1878 to Limestone where his father practiced law. He graduated from Alfred University in 1898, and from University at Buffalo Law School in 1900. He was admitted to the bar, and practiced in Buffalo in partnership with Frank M. Loomis. On June 30, 1902, Gibbs married Jessie Mandana Mayne (born 1877), and they had three children.

Gibbs was a member of the Buffalo Civil Service Commission from 1910 to 1914; and a member of the New York State Assembly (Erie Co., 8th D.) in 1915 and 1916.

He was a member of the New York State Senate (50th D.) from 1917 to 1926, sitting in the 140th, 141st, 142nd, 143rd, 144th, 145th, 146th, 147th, 148th and 149th New York State Legislatures.

Sources
 New York Red Book (1922; pg. 77)
 EX-SENATOR GIBBS DIES in NYT on June 2, 1930 (subscription required)
 ALFRED LOST FRIEND in The Alfred Sun, of Alfred, New York, June 19, 1930
 Gibbs genealogy at Family Tree Maker

1875 births
1930 deaths
Republican Party New York (state) state senators
Politicians from Buffalo, New York
People from Salamanca, New York
Republican Party members of the New York State Assembly
Alfred University alumni
University at Buffalo Law School alumni
Lawyers from Buffalo, New York